Anna Anatolyevna Pavlova (born 6 September 1987) is a Russian-born artistic gymnast who won two bronze medals at the 2004 Olympic Games in Athens, and represented Russia in other international competitions. In 2002 she won the Russian National Championships.

Pavlova competed for Azerbaijan from 2013, winning silver at the 2014 European Championships on vault. She was well known for her balletic style and clean technique. Pavlova retired in 2015 at the age of 28.

Career

2000–2002 
Pavlova first emerged on the international gymnastics scene in 2000, winning a gold medal on the uneven bars at the Junior European Championships. Although she was too young to compete as a senior at the World Championships in 2001, she was allowed to participate in the Goodwill Games, where she earned a silver medal on the balance beam. In 2001 Pavlova won the junior women's nationals.

In 2002, still too young to compete internationally as a senior, Pavlova won the Russian National Championships. She earned four medals, including team, vault and all-around gold, at the Junior European Championships that year.

2003 
Pavlova competed at the 2003 World Championships during her first year as a senior gymnast, and the Russian team finished sixth. Pavlova did not earn an individual medal; she had qualified for the individual all-around, vault and floor finals, but mistakes prevented her from placing among the top three.

2004 
In 2004, Pavlova competed in the European Championships team competition. She fell from the uneven bars, which she was a favorite to win, and did not qualify for the all-around. Later that year, Pavlova claimed the Russian national title and made the Russian Olympic team.

At the 2004 Summer Olympics in Athens, Greece, Pavlova had her best performance to date. The Russian team fought their way back onto the medal podium, finishing third behind Romania and the United States. In the individual all-around, she placed fourth and missed the bronze medal by a fraction, 0.025, behind China's Zhang Nan. Pavlova won an individual bronze medal on the vault during the event finals, narrowly missing silver, whilst a mistake in beam finals cost her a medal. She finished fourth behind Romania's Alexandra Georgiana Eremia. Her floor music at the Olympics was "Winter" by Bond.

2005–2006 
Pavlova is one of the few Russian gymnasts from the 2004 Olympic team who chose to continue competing; she won silver all-around at the 2005 European Championships. She also competed in the 2005 World Championships in Melbourne, Australia, where she qualified to the all-around final, as well as the vault and beam apparatus finals. The following year, Pavlova competed at the 2006 World Championships, where she won a bronze medal with the Russian team. She once again qualified to the all-around, vault and beam finals.

2008 
Pavlova was named to the Russian Olympic team for the 2008 Summer Olympics. On August 10, 2008, in the preliminary round, she performed her floor routine to "Exodus" by Maksim. She qualified fifth for the all-around final and also made the finals on vault, beam and floor. In the team final, Russia finished fourth; Romania won the bronze. In the vault final, Pavlova scored 0 on her second vault because she started before the green light was lit. In the floor final, she was still unsettled from the vault competition and did not perform well. Two days later, she finished fourth in the balance beam final, 0.050 behind China's Cheng Fei.

In November 2008, Pavlova tore two ligaments in her knee during her beam dismount at the DTB World Cup event in Stuttgart. Surgery was required to reattach the ligaments. Pavlova told a Russian sports website, "I hope, of course, that I'll be able to return to gymnastics, but I don't have full confidence in that yet."

Before her injury, Pavlova had placed third on vault in Stuttgart. At the time of the injury, she was ranked third in the world on beam and vault.

2009–2010 
In August 2009, Pavlova resumed training. At the end of September, she began competing at the local level. She participated in the All Russia Dinamo competition and won gold on the uneven bars and bronze on the balance beam. After having competed at several local competitions, her first big meet was scheduled to be the 2009 Voronin Memorial. Her father died just a few days before the event, and she had to withdraw to be with family. 

Pavlova appeared at the 2010 Russian Nationals in March with a heavily bandaged knee. Although she did not compete full-difficulty routines, she placed a respectable 10th in the individual all-around, and she won the gold medal with her team, the Central Federal District. She posted the highest score on vault to qualify for the event final, where she finished 5th.

2011 
In 2011, Pavlova competed in the 2011 Trnava Cup, finishing second behind Romanian Larisa Iordache. Later that year, she competed in the Voronin Cup, finishing 5th in the all-around. She finished third in vault finals, despite a fall on her second vault, a layout Podkopayeva (Yurchenko 1/2 turn on, layout front somersault 1/2). Later that day, she finished 3rd again on beam, despite a near-fall on her 2.5 twist dismount.

Nationality change 

Pavlova began to compete for Azerbaijan in November 2013, saying that Russian gymnastics did not give her sufficient scope. She said that she had always been interested in international competition, and Russian gymnastics did not give her the opportunities she wanted. The Russian national coaches had not selected her for any major international meet since her knee surgery at the end of 2008.

It is also possible that politics may have been part of it. Pavlova said that "her vocal opposition to the political decisions" may have gone against her.

2014 
Pavlova was selected to compete at the 2014 European Women's Artistic Gymnastics Championships along with another former Russian gymnast, Yulia Inshina. She qualified second into the vault finals behind Giulia Steingruber with a score of 14.516. In the vault finals, she scored a 14.583 which earned her the silver medal. This was her first medal at a major international meet since 2008 and the first medal she won competing for Azerbaijan. This was also Azerbaijan's first ever medal at the European Gymnastics Championships.

2015: Retirement 
On December 15, 2015, it was announced that Pavlova would retire from elite gymnastics. She has expressed desire to continue in the sport, as a gymnastics coach with her mother.

Floor music
2008-2010: "Exodus" by Maksim Mrvica
2006-2007: "Juno and Avos" by Alexei Rybnikov
2006: "Allegretto" by Bond
2004-2005: "Wintersun" by Bond
2003: "Korobushka" by Bond
2000: "Smuglyanka" by Shvedov

Competitive history

Competitor for Azerbaijan

Competitor for Russia

See also 

 List of Olympic female gymnasts for Russia

References

External links

 
 
 
 Anna Pavlova First Official Site (under construction)
 Current Official Website
 Anna Pavlova at YouTube

1987 births
Living people
People from Orekhovo-Zuyevo
Gymnasts at the 2004 Summer Olympics
Russian female artistic gymnasts
Azerbaijani female artistic gymnasts
Olympic gymnasts of Russia
Olympic bronze medalists for Russia
Medalists at the World Artistic Gymnastics Championships
Gymnasts at the 2008 Summer Olympics
Olympic medalists in gymnastics
Medalists at the 2004 Summer Olympics
Azerbaijani people of Russian descent
Competitors at the 2001 Goodwill Games
Goodwill Games medalists in gymnastics
Sportspeople from Moscow Oblast